Jay Chaudhuri (born August 6, 1969) is an American attorney, professor, politician and a Democratic member of the North Carolina Senate. First appointed to fill a vacancy in April 2016 caused by the resignation of Josh Stein (to run for North Carolina Attorney General), Chaudhuri was later elected and re-elected, becoming North Carolina's first Indian-American state legislator. In January 2019, he was elected by his colleagues to serve as Senate Minority (Democratic) Whip, the second-highest ranking position in the Democratic caucus.

Early life and education
Born in Chattanooga, Tennessee to Bengali immigrants, Chaudhuri moved to Fayetteville, North Carolina when he was 3. Chaudhuri went on to study at Terry Sanford High School in Fayetteville, later attending Davidson College, Columbia University, and finally North Carolina Central University School of Law.

Career
A longtime aide to then-State Senator and state Attorney General Roy Cooper, and later to state treasurer Janet Cowell, Chaudhuri taught part-time as an adjunct law professor at North Carolina Central University for two years. In 2016, Chaudhuri joined plaintiff law firm Cohen Milstein as a part-time counsel.

References

External links

|-

Democratic Party North Carolina state senators
Davidson College alumni
Politicians from Raleigh, North Carolina
American politicians of Indian descent
Asian-American people in North Carolina politics
Columbia University alumni
North Carolina Central University alumni
North Carolina Central University faculty
Politicians from Chattanooga, Tennessee
1969 births
Living people
21st-century American politicians